Ty - Top Model Is a Russian reality TV show based on America's Next Top Model by Tyra Banks, it is the third installment of the show after Ty - supermodel (2004–2007) and Top Model po-russki (2011–2014). The show showed a number of aspiring contestants competing against each other in a series of challenges for the Russia's Top Model title.

The jury consists of social media star and 1st runner-up Miss Russia 2014 , Anastasia Reshetova; TV star Alexander Gudkov; Fashion stylist and designer Gosha Kartsev and fashion designer Philipp Plein .

The winner of the contest will win an advertising contract for the Philip Plein for 1 year and a cash prize of 3,000,000 Russian rubles.

The winner of this season was 20-year-old Tina Tova from Krasnodar.

On 19 January 2022, it was announced that castings had begun for season two.

Cycles

Contestants 
(Ages stated are at start of contest )

 Roma Milova is also known as Tatyana Krokhina. Winner of Ty - supermodel.

Episode summaries

Episode 1 
Original airdate: 
 
The episode started with 70 semi-finalists invited to the project, where the judges will decide on the first top 20 to participate in the first photoshoot. After this, only 10 will continue on in the casting process where after 3 weeks, the final 14 models will participate in the competition.

Eliminated semifinalists: Angelina Garanina, Aleksandra 'Sancesca' Naumova, Anna Mikhailova, Antonina 'Tonya' Starostina, Inessa Bogoslovskaya, Kate Bezvulyak, Ulyana Minenko, Veronika Osichkina, Yana Petrova & Yuliana Lyamina
Special guests: Vlada Roslyakova

Episode 2 
Original airdate: 

Continuing from last week, another 20 girls arrived, where once again only 10 will be chosen to advance into the next round.

Eliminated semifinalists: Maria Trubitsyna, Valeria Salnikova & Zaki Musin
Featured photographer:
Special guests:

Episode 3 
Original airdate: 

This week, the final 20 contestants from the previous weeks were narrowed down to the final top 14.

Eliminated semifinalists: Anastasiya Chervyakova, Anastasiya Voznyuk, Angelina Andrianova, Elena Sarattseva, Kristina Bridan & Sofia Tuzovskaya
Featured photographer:
Special guests:

Episode 4 
Original airdate: 

Bottom three: Aleksandra Kosygina, Nika Kraush & Polina Chernysheva
Eliminated: Aleksandra Kosygina & Polina Chernysheva
Featured photographer: 
Special guests:

Episode 5 
Original airdate: 

Bottom three: Katya Pan, Anastasiya Chernobaeva & Nika Kraush
Eliminated: Katya Pan & Anastasiya Chernobaeva
Featured photographer: 
Special guests: Lyasan Utiasheva

Episode 6 
Original airdate: 

Quit: Nika Kraush
Bottom three:  Eva Evans, Liza Vdovina & Sabina Rabaia
Eliminated: Liza Vdovina
Featured photographer: 
Special guests:

Episode 7 
Original airdate: 

Bottom three:  Eva Evans, Polina Zasimenkova & Sabina Rabaia
Eliminated: Eva Evans & Polina Zasimenkova
Featured photographer: 
Special guests:

Episode 8 
Original airdate: 

Returned: Anastasiya Chernobaeva & Katya Pan
Bottom three:  Katya Pan, Sabina Rabaia & Tina Tova
Eliminated: Sabina Rabaia & Tina Tova
Featured photographer: 
Special guests: Ksenia Sobchak

Episode 9 
Original airdate: 

Returned: Tina Tova
Bottom three:  Anna Tregub, Katya Pan, & Tina Tova
Eliminated: Katya Pan
Featured photographer: 
Special guests:

Episode 10 
Original airdate: 

Bottom three:  Anastasiya Chernobaeva, Roma Milova & Tina Tova
Eliminated: Anastasiya Chernobaeva & Roma Milova
Featured photographer: 
Special guests:

Episode 11 
Original airdate: 

Bottom two:  Anna Tregub & Vika Kuznetsova
Eliminated: Anna Tregub
Featured photographer: 
Special guests:

Episode 12 
Original airdate: 

Final three:  Vika Kuznetsova, Tina Tova, & Yana Dobroliubova
Eliminated: Yana Dobroliubova
Final two: Tina Tova & Vika Kuznetsova
Ty - Topmodel: Tina Tova
Featured photographer: 
Special guests:

Call-out order 

 The contestant won photo of the week
 The contestant was in danger of elimination
 The contestant was eliminated
 The contestant quit the competition
 The contestant won the competition

 Episodes 1, 2 & 3 are casting episodes. In episodes 1 & 2 the number of semi-finalists was reduced from 70 to 20.
 In episode 3, the remaining 20 semifinalists were reduced to 14 finalists.
 In episode 8, Anastasia and Katya were brought back into the competition
 In episode 9, Tina was brought back into the competition

Photo shoots

Episode 1: Divas (Casting)
Episode 2: B&W vogue dancing (Casting)
Episode 3: Trust jump into the male crowd (Casting)
Episode 4: Portret photos with reptiles
Episode 5: Fashion athletes
Episode 6: Fashion video in underwear
Episode 7: Catwalk in train
Episode 8: Underwater photoshoot
Episode 9: Natural Beauty Shoot
Episode 10: Catherine the Great
Episode 11: Duel in the ring
Episode 12: Artistic statue

References

Top Model series (Russia)
2020s Russian television series
Russian television series based on American television series
2021 Russian television series debuts